Luc Gilbert Cyrille Nilis (born 25 May 1967) is a Belgian professional football manager and former player who is the head coach of Belgian Division 2 club Belisia Bilzen. He enjoyed a successful career in his native Belgium and, in particular, in the Netherlands with PSV. His playing days came to an end in the 2000–01 season after breaking his leg in a match with his club Aston Villa following a clash with Ipswich Town goalkeeper Richard Wright.

Club career
His former clubs include K.F.C. Winterslag, R.S.C. Anderlecht, PSV and Aston Villa.

Having left Anderlecht for Eindhoven in 1994, Nilis topped the Dutch scoring charts in the 1995–96 season, plundering 21 goals. He continued that form into 1996–97 – leading the pack by December 1996 with 13 – before matching his previous total, in a season that ended with PSV winning the league title for the first time in five years. In late 1997, Nilis scored thrice in three games over a fifteen-day period, all against Shay Given; with a goal at Newcastle United in the 1997–98 UEFA Champions League group stage coming in between goals for Belgium against the Republic of Ireland. During his time with PSV, Nilis formed one of the deadliest partnerships in Europe with team-mate Ruud van Nistelrooy, who signed for PSV in 1998. In the 1998–99 season, Nilis and van Nistelrooy scored 55 league goals between them. Van Nistelrooy finished as top-scorer, Nilis came second. In the following season, Nilis' last for PSV, they scored 48 league goals between them.

After six years in the Netherlands, Nillis joined Aston Villa on a Bosman transfer in June 2000. Nilis' Villa career started well, as he scored on his debut in the UEFA Intertoto Cup against Dukla Příbram on 22 July 2000 before going on to score on his league debut against Chelsea on 27 August 2000. In a league match against Ipswich Town on 9 September 2000, Nilis was involved in a clash with goalkeeper Richard Wright that left him with a double compound fracture of his right shin. At one point the injury became infected and Nilis even feared a possible amputation. This hypothesis was later ruled out, although his playing career was effectively ended.

Ronaldo occasionally names Nilis as one of the best strike partners he had played with despite sharing only a brief time with him at PSV. Ruud van Nistelrooy has also stated on several occasions that the Belgian was one of the best players, if not the best, he had ever played with.

International career
Nilis played 56 times for the Belgium national team, scoring 10 times. A prolific goalscorer with his clubs, he scored his first goal for Belgium only on his 24th cap (a 9–0 win against Zambia).

Nilis played in the FIFA World Cups in 1994 and 1998. Qualification for the latter was sealed with Nilis' goals in each leg of Belgium's playoff against the Irish Republic. Nilis dropped out of international football after the 1998 Finals, reportedly in response to an "unhealthy atmosphere within the squad and their lack of achievement". However, with control of the Belgian national side having changed, Nilis returned to the international fold in November 1999, in time for Euro 2000, co-hosted by his birth-country Belgium and the Netherlands.

Coaching career
After his playing career Beringen-Heusden-Zolder were his next port of call, becoming technical director in 2005, not long before the club's liquidation after financial difficulties. Nilis took a job with PSV, first as a scout and then training the club's forwards. In January 2011, Nilis became assistant manager with Turkish club Kasımpaşa S.K., followed by another assistant manager stint with Gençlerbirliği S.K., also in Turkey. In April 2015 he was re-hired by PSV as a striker coach.

In August 2021, Nilis became the head coach of Belgian Division 2 club Belisia Bilzen, which had been founded earlier that year from a merger between Spouwen-Mopertingen and Bilzerse Waltwilder. It was his first assignment as head coach. In the round of 16 of the Belgian Cup, Belisia were drawn against Gent. At the end of October 2021, they lost that cup match 4–0. In addition to his position as manager of Belisia Bilzen, Nilis was also hired as striker trainer at the Talent Academy of KRC Genk on 10 March 2022.

Personal life
Nilis's father, Roger (1938–2011), played as a professional footballer in Belgium in the 1960s.

Career statistics

Club

International
Scores and results list Belgium's goal tally first, score column indicates score after each Nilis goal.

Honours
Anderlecht
Belgian First Division: 1986–87, 1990–91, 1992–93, 1993–94
Belgian Cup: 1988–89, 1989–90, 1993–94
Belgian Supercup: 1987, 1993
European Cup Winners' Cup runner-up: 1989–90
Bruges Matins: 1988

PSV
Eredivisie: 1996–97, 1999–2000
KNVB Cup: 1995–96; runner-up:1997–98
Johan Cruyff Shield: 1996, 1997, 1998

Individual
Belgian Bronze Shoe: 1990, 1991
Dutch Eredivisie Footballer of the Year: 1995
Belgian Professional Footballer of the Year: 1995–96
Eredivisie Top Scorer: 1995–96 (21 goals), 1996–97 (21 goals)
Golden Shoe Lifetime Achievement Award: 2001
AD The Best PSV Team Ever: 2020
DH The Best RSC Anderlecht Team Ever: 2020

References

External links
Voetbal international website – Nilis stats 
Beijen website – CV 
Eurosoccer website – End of career report
Google Video – Luc Nilis Compilation

1967 births
Living people
Sportspeople from Hasselt
Footballers from Limburg (Belgium)
Association football forwards
Belgian footballers
Flemish sportspeople
K.F.C. Winterslag players
R.S.C. Anderlecht players
PSV Eindhoven players
Aston Villa F.C. players
Belgian Pro League players
Eredivisie players
Premier League players
Belgium international footballers
Belgium under-21 international footballers
Belgium youth international footballers
1994 FIFA World Cup players
1998 FIFA World Cup players
UEFA Euro 2000 players
Belgian expatriate sportspeople in the Netherlands
Expatriate footballers in the Netherlands
Expatriate footballers in England
Belgian expatriate sportspeople in England
Belgian football managers
PSV Eindhoven non-playing staff
Gençlerbirliği S.K. non-playing staff